Fabrice Reuperne (born September 18, 1975 in Saint-Pierre, Martinique) is a footballer, who currently plays in Golden Star.

Reuperne played for the Martinique national football team at the 2002 CONCACAF Gold Cup finals, helping the team reach the quarterfinals.
At the 2013 CONCACAF Gold Cup he scored the winning goal against Canada in Martinique's opening match, a long range blast in the 93rd minute.

Personal life
Reuperné is the father of the Martinique international footballer Enrick Reuperné.

International

International goals
Scores and results list Martinique's goal tally first.

References

External links
 Player profile - AO Kerkyra 

1975 births
Living people
Association football defenders
Martiniquais footballers
Stade de Reims players
AS Cannes players
Clermont Foot players
Martiniquais expatriate footballers
PAS Giannina F.C. players
A.O. Kerkyra players
SO Romorantin players
Expatriate footballers in Greece
Martiniquais expatriate sportspeople in Greece
Martinique international footballers
Association football midfielders
2002 CONCACAF Gold Cup players
2013 CONCACAF Gold Cup players